The 1909 Giro d'Italia was the inaugural edition of the Giro d'Italia, one of cycling's Grand Tours. The field consisted of 115 riders, and 49 riders finished the race.

By rider

By nationality

References

1909 Giro d'Italia
1909